Benjamin Jacobs House is a historic home located in West Whiteland Township, Chester County, Pennsylvania, United States. It was built about 1790, and was originally a two-story, three bay, double pile side hall stone dwelling in the 2/3 Georgian style. It has a gable roof with dormers. The house has a stone kitchen wing, making the house five bays wide, and frame wing with a two-story porch.

It was listed on the National Register of Historic Places in 1984.

References

Georgian architecture in Pennsylvania
Houses completed in 1790
Houses in Chester County, Pennsylvania
Houses on the National Register of Historic Places in Pennsylvania
National Register of Historic Places in Chester County, Pennsylvania